Tykkimäki is an amusement park in Kouvola, Finland. It has 30 different rides, along with some restaurants and kiosks. A camping site and Lake Käyrälampi are located near Tykkimäki.

The park opened in 1986 and is operated by the Children's Day Foundation. Many of Tykkimäki's rides are preowned rides bought from other parks, most often from Linnanmäki or Särkänniemi. The latest ride relocation happened in 2007, when Tykkimäki opened the Kouvola-pyörä Ferris wheel, which had been at Linnanmäki over 40 years.

Rides and attractions

Major rides

Family rides

Kiddie rides

Attractions

Removed rides

References

Amusement parks in Finland
Kouvola
Buildings and structures in Kymenlaakso
Tourist attractions in Kymenlaakso
1986 establishments in Finland
Amusement parks opened in 1986
World Rallycross circuits